VA-82 has the following meanings:
Attack Squadron 82 (U.S. Navy)
State Route 82 (Virginia)